Emma C. Cooke (September 7, 1848 – January 22, 1929) was an American archer who competed in the early twentieth century. She was born in Fayetteville, Pennsylvania. Cooke won two silver medals in Archery at the 1904 Summer Olympics in Missouri in the double national and Columbia rounds behind Matilda Howell.

References

External links

  
 
 

1848 births
1929 deaths
American female archers
Archers at the 1904 Summer Olympics
Olympic silver medalists for the United States in archery
Place of birth missing
Medalists at the 1904 Summer Olympics
19th-century American women
20th-century American women